Tim Wiesner (born 21 November 1996) is a German professional footballer who plays as a goalkeeper for SC Verl.

References

1996 births
Footballers from Dortmund
Living people
German footballers
Association football goalkeepers
Fortuna Düsseldorf II players
Fortuna Düsseldorf players
VfL Osnabrück players
SC Verl players
Regionalliga players
2. Bundesliga players